Yankee Don is a 1931 American Western film directed by Noel M. Smith and starring Richard Talmadge, Lupita Tovar and Julian Rivero.

Plot
Mexican landowner Don Juan hires New Yorker Dick Carsey to oversee construction of a pipeline through Juan's land. Meanwhile, the construction foreman secretly tried to undermine both of them and gain access to the land for himself.

Cast
 Richard Talmadge
 Lupita Tovar 
 Julian Rivero 
 Sam Appel 
 Gayne Whitman 
 Alma Real 
 Victor Metzetti

References

External links

1931 films
American Western (genre) films
1931 Western (genre) films
1930s English-language films
Films directed by Noel M. Smith
American black-and-white films
1930s American films